The 2014 Porsche Mobil 1 Supercup season was the 22nd Porsche Supercup season. It began on 11 May at Circuit de Catalunya and finished on 2 November at Circuit of the Americas, after ten scheduled races, all of which were support events for the 2014 Formula One season.

Teams and drivers

Race calendar and results
An updated race calendar was released on 12 June, with the round at the Sochi Autodrom being replaced by a round at the Circuit of the Americas.

Championship standings

Drivers' Championship

† – Drivers did not finish the race, but were classified as they completed over 90% of the race distance.

Teams' Championship

References

External links
 
 Porsche Mobil 1 Supercup Online Magazine

Porsche Supercup seasons
Porsche Supercup